Brian Patrick Burns (July 12, 1936 – August 12, 2021) was an American entrepreneur, attorney and philanthropist. A leader in the Irish-American community, Burns was a distinguished collector of Irish art. In December 2016, Maggie Haberman of The New York Times reported that then president-elect Donald Trump intended to name Burns as the next United States Ambassador to Ireland. However, in June 2017, Burns withdrew his name from consideration, due to ill health.

Personal life and education

Family 
Born in Boston, Massachusetts, Brian P. Burns was a third-generation Irish-American who traced his ancestry to County Kerry in the South-West region of Ireland. Burns's father, the Honorable John J. Burns (1901–1957), became a full professor of law at Harvard Law School at the age of 29, and sat on the Massachusetts Superior Court at age 30. Burns Sr. was the first General Counsel to the newly formed Securities and Exchange Commission (SEC) chaired by Joseph P. Kennedy Sr., and established by Franklin D. Roosevelt in 1934. In 1936, after resigning his position as counsel to the SEC, Burns Sr. entered private legal practice as a senior partner in the firm of Burns, Currie, Rich and Rice of New York.

Brian P. Burns and his wife Eileen have eight children, four each from previous marriages, and fifteen grandchildren. Brian's four children were from his first marriage to Sheila O'Connor Burns. During the presentation of Palm Beach Atlantic University's American Free Enterprise Medal to Brian P. Burns in 2012, former U.S. Senator George LeMieux remarked that Burns and wife Eileen were the second married couple to receive PBA's highest awards, the American Free Enterprise medal and the Women of Distinction Award which Eileen Burns received in 2011.

Education 

In 1959, at the age of 23, Brian P. Burns received a law degree from Harvard Law School. He graduated from the College of the Holy Cross in 1957. He was a graduate of St. Sebastian's School in Needham, MA.

Professional career 

Brian P. Burns was chairman of BF Enterprises, Inc., a publicly owned real estate holding and development company. He was a partner at several law firms in San Francisco including, Burns & Whitehead (1978–1986); Cullinan, Burns & Helmer (1975–1978); and Cullinan, Hancock, Rothert & Burns (1965–1974). Burns was a director of the Kellogg Company of Battle Creek, Michigan, from 1979 to 1989 and served as the first Chairman of its Finance Committee. He also served as a director and Chairman of the Executive Committee of The Coca-Cola Bottling Co. of New York, Inc.  He began his career as an associate at Webster, Sheffield, Fleischmann, Hitchcock & Brookfield in New York City (1960–1964). In 1958–1959, he was Special Assistant to the Regional Administrator of the SEC's New York Regional Office.

American Ireland Fund merger 

In 1963, President John F. Kennedy, America's first Irish Catholic president, visited his ancestral home in County Wexford, Ireland. During this visit, he and Ireland's President Éamon de Valera formed the American Irish Foundation to facilitate fundraising efforts for Irish and Irish-American charities and institutions. President Kennedy appointed Brian P. Burns to be the first director of the American Irish Foundation in 1963.  As director of the American Irish Foundation, Burns played a pivotal role in fundraising for the restoration of Marsh's Library at St. Patrick's Close in Dublin. He also founded the American Law Library at University College Cork in honor of his late father.

In an effort to expand the reach of the American Irish Foundation, Brian P. Burns spearheaded the merger of the American Irish Foundation and The Ireland Funds, founded by Dan Rooney of the Pittsburgh Steelers and Sir Anthony O'Reilly, the Irish-born chairman of Heinz. On St. Patrick's Day 1987, the two organizations merged at a White House ceremony to form The American Ireland Fund. Presiding over the ceremony, President Ronald Reagan remarked:

The American Ireland Fund is the largest of 12 funds comprising The Ireland Funds. These funds are private entities dedicated to raising money for Irish charities and the well-being of members of the Irish diaspora. Burns was a lifetime trustee of the organization.

Awards 

On March 21, 2013, Brian P. Burns was inducted into the Irish America Hall of Fame alongside former Vice-President (and now President) of the United States, Joe Biden. He was introduced at the ceremony by John L. Lahey, President of Quinnipiac University.

Burns received Palm Beach Atlantic University's American Free Enterprise medal on November 8, 2012.

In 2013, Burns was inducted as a member of The Order of St. Patrick, a prestigious award created by Heritage Publishing to honor major achievements of Irish Americans.

Burns was featured in Patricia Harty's 2000 book, The Greatest Irish Americans of the 20th Century, and named one of the top 100 Art Collectors by Arts and Antiques magazine in 1996.

Also in 1996, Burns received the Eire Society of Boston's Gold Medal award, an honor he shares with other well-known Irish and Irish-American figures, including the author Colm Tóibín and former President of Ireland Mary McAleese.

Philanthropy

The John J. Burns Library at Boston College 

In 1986, Brian P. Burns and the Burns family founded The John J. Burns Library at Boston College. The Burns Library is the college's repository of rare books, special collections, and archives. The library's Irish Collection, formally established in 1948, is one of the top repositories of Irish history, literature, and culture in the world. The Burns Library was dedicated on April 22, 1986, with a commitment to expand the literary holdings of the Irish collection. Described as the guardian of Irish culture, the Burns Library is dedicated to preserving the abundant historical, literary, musical, and artistic heritage of Ireland, and to providing liberal access for research, teaching, and general appreciation through online resources and onsite exhibitions. The Burns Library continues to increase the richness and diversity of its Irish-related collections through strategic purchases and donations. Today, it holds more than 50,000 volumes documenting Irish history, literature, and culture, dozens of manuscript and archival collections, and significant holdings of photographs, artworks, maps, and ephemera, making it the largest and most comprehensive collection of Irish research materials outside Ireland.

The library's holdings contain over 300,000 books and 17 million rare manuscripts and artifacts. It is the largest collection of Irish rare books and manuscripts in the Western Hemisphere. Dr. Robert K. O'Neill was appointed the first Burns Librarian and over his 26-year career assembled some of the most significant library and archival collections pertaining to the four Irish authors who have thus far been awarded the Nobel Prize for Literature: William Butler Yeats (1923), George Bernard Shaw (1925), Samuel Beckett (1969), and Seamus Heaney (1995). Other notable holdings include the archives of Northern Ireland photojournalist Bobbie Hanvey, comprising more than 75,000 images not only of the paramilitary conflicts and daily life during the decades of "The Troubles" but also some of the most widely circulated photographs of Heaney and other Irish cultural icons.

The Burns Visiting Scholar in Irish Studies Program 

Through the Burns Foundation, Brian P. Burns established the Burns Visiting Scholar in Irish Studies Program in 1991. The program is a cooperative venture between the Boston College University Libraries and the Center for Irish Programs. Each academic year, the Burns Library welcomes a distinguished academician, writer or artist who has made significant contributions to Irish cultural and intellectual life. Since the program's inception, the Burns Scholars have included Irish and British scholars, including two former directors of the National Library of Ireland; historians; political scientists; medievalists; literary critics and editors; Irish language specialists and poets; and one musician and musicologist. The Scholars receive support for their work and participate in the larger goal of advancing Irish-American cultural links. As Gerald Dawe, Burns Scholar 2004–05, puts it, "Irish Studies is a force field of cultural and literary knowledge." Colmán O'Clabaigh, a Benedictine monk and Burns Scholar of 2016, uses medieval Ireland as his laboratory for his inquiry into the impact of religion on all aspects of life among the common people. During her year as a Scholar, Margaret Kelleher, 2002–03, collaborated with Professor Philip O'Leary of Boston College on the Cambridge History of Irish Literature, which is the first comprehensive history of Irish literature written in both its major languages, Irish and English. Spanning fifteen centuries of literary achievement, the two volumes range from the earliest medieval Latin texts to the late twentieth century and have become a key source for Irish studies scholarship.

Collection of Irish art 

The focus of Brian P. Burns' collection of Irish art is, with few exceptions, works created after the Great Famine. The collection has been exhibited at museums and cultural institutions throughout the United States and Ireland, including exhibitions at the McMullen Museum of Art, Boston College, Dublin's Hugh Lane Gallery, the Yale Center for British Art in New Haven, Connecticut, the Kennedy Center in Washington, D.C., and the Phoenix Art Museum in Arizona. In 2014, the collection was exhibited at the Consulate General of Ireland, New York, in an exhibition curated by Turlough McConnell Communications.

Kate Robinson describes Burns' intention in collecting Irish art as a means "to become involved in the cultural development of his ancestral country and to correct the impression that we were a nation [Ireland] without a visual imagination." The collection includes paintings by F.J. Davis, Erskine Nicol, Maurice MacGonigal, Walter Chetwood Aiken, Roderic O'Conor, Henry Robertson Craig, Sir John Lavery, Frank McKelvey, Leo Whelan and Jack Butler Yeats, as well as sculpture by Rowan Gillespie.

References 

1936 births
2021 deaths
People from Boston
American people of Irish descent
College of the Holy Cross alumni
Harvard Law School alumni
American philanthropists
American lawyers
American art collectors